Skip and Shannon: Undisputed is an American sports and entertainment talk show starring Skip Bayless and Shannon Sharpe. The series premiered on Fox Sports 1 on September 6, 2016.

Theme song
The show's opening theme song, "No Mercy", was recorded by American rapper Lil Wayne, a friend of Bayless' and a frequent guest from his former ESPN show First Take. The song was written and produced by Jared Gutstadt, president and CCO of Jingle Punks Music, which had partnered with Fox Sports prior to the show's launch. The full-length version of "No Mercy" was released by Cash Money Records to iTunes in September 2016, and Lil Wayne appeared on Undisputeds inaugural episode on September 6 and has since regularly made guest appearances.

Viewership
Undisputed averaged 107,000 viewers per episode from September 9 to December 31, 2016, and 155,000 viewers during 2017, representing a 45% increase in viewership. During July 24–28 of that year, it averaged 136,000 viewers, 65,000 of which were adults in the 18–49 years of age range. Compared to competing weekday morning sports programs in the same time slot, it outdrew ESPN2's edition of Sportscenter (117,000) but fell behind First Take (320,000) in overall viewership.

In 2018, Undisputed averaged 165,000 viewers, and in 2019 through August 9, 2019), averaged 169,000 viewers. In 2021, the show averaged 199,000 viewers during the month of October, which beat the show's previous October peak of 182,000 viewers in 2019 and granting the show its most successful October to date.

As of November 2022, the series' highest-rated broadcast occurred following FS1's English language telecast of  England vs Iran, when the show averaged 499,000 viewers.

References

Further reading
 
 

2010s American television talk shows
2016 American television series debuts
American sports television series
Fox Sports 1 original programming